Venetia may refer to:

Places
 Veneto or Venetia, a modern Italian region
 Veneția, a tributary of the Olt River in Romania
 Venetia, Pennsylvania, United States, an unincorporated community
 487 Venetia, an asteroid

Arts and entertainment
 Venetia (Disraeli novel), an 1837 novel by Benjamin Disraeli
 Venetia (Heyer novel), a 1958 novel by Georgette Heyer
 "Venetia", a song from the album Eternal Atake by Lil Uzi Vert

Other uses
 Venetia (given name), a list of people and fictional characters
 , a British Royal Navy destroyer launched in 1917 and sunk in 1940
 , a steam yacht leased by the U.S. during World War I
 Venetia Diamond Mine, South Africa's largest producer of diamonds

See also
 Venetia et Histria, an Augustan region of ancient Roman Italy
 Kingdom of Lombardy–Venetia (1815–1866), a crown land in the Austrian Empire
 Veneția de Jos and Veneția de Sus, villages in Părău Commune, Brașov County, Romania
 Venice (disambiguation)
 Veneti (disambiguation)
 Venetian (disambiguation)